Keiji Uematsu (born 1947) is a Japanese sculptor and contemporary artist.

Biography

From boyhood to Univ. 
Keiji Uematsu was born on March 26, 1947 in Kobe, Japan. His father drew illustrations and lettered in the printing factory. His eldest son died shortly after birth, Keiji was the second first son grew up watching his job, and the next son Eiji later became an artist using soil as a material.
Keiji loved painting and making models, and reading the science magazine for the schoolkids also. He became interested in the wonders of science, went often to the museums of the science or the natural history. He thought he wanted to grasp the mechanism of the wonder of the earth or the space from the primitive perspective. This is related to his later artistic work.
His father did not allow him to go on to art college, so he entered the art department of the Faculty of Education, Kobe University, graduated in 1969, became a teacher of the arts and crafts at a public school.

Beginning of artist activity 
While teaching at the public elementary school and the technical high school, he created his own artworks and presented Transparence - Iron at the 1st Contemporary International Sculpture Exhibition (The Hakone Open-air Museum, Kanagawa, 1969). In the same year he held his first solo exhibition at Galerie 16 in Kyoto, presented Tranceparence - H2O. He also exhibited at the Kyoto Biennale 1972.

Leap overseas 
He was selected for Japan: Tradition und Genenwart exhibition (Städtische Kunsthalle Düsseldorf, Düsseldorf), sent the work in 1974, October he received the 2nd Kobe City Cultural Encouragement Award. He also appeared in a small role of the famous indie film I Can't Wait Getting Dark! (directed by Kazuki Ohmori).
In September 1975 he went to West Germany for the destination of Düsseldorf, where the activities of artists are active. From December 1976 to 1977 he held the first solo exhibition in Europe Skulptur, Foto, Video, Film (Moderna Museet Stockholm, Sweden). Since then, he has presented many works at museums and galleries in Europe.
His first solo exhibition in N.Y. Installation, Axis-Latitude-Longitude was held in 1981 at P.S.1 (the annex of MoMA). He was invited by Fondation Cartier pour L'Art, and exhibited at Sculptures in Paris from 1985 to 1986 the open-air work Situation-Triangle for the first time in 14 years. After this he produced many open-air sculptures in Europe, Japan and South Korea.

Dual base of artist's life 
He established a new base in Nishinomiya, Kobe in March 1986, since then he continued to work going back and forth between West Germany and Japan. Due to the Great Hanshin-Awaji Earthquake in 1995 he lost Nishinomiya base, moved to Minoo-city of Osaka.
He was selected as a Japanese national artist along with Shigeo Toya and Katsura Funakoshi, for the 43rd Venice Biennale 1988, presented his work Inversion-Vertical space at the Japan Pavilion.
In the 1990s he continued vigorous production activities. His first solo exhibition in a Japanese museum Behind the Perception was held at Otani Memorial Museum, Nishinomiya, 1997.

Activities of the new century 
In 2003 at Kitakyushu Municipal Museum of Art, he was held solo exhibition of photo works mainly Thinking about the Body and Eyes: Photos, Films from the 70's to the Present. In 2006 at Otani Memorial Museum, Nishinomiya the exhibition Keiji Uematsu, The Garden of Time was held. Even in the 21st century, he continues to hold solo exhibitions almost twice a year.
In 2013, he won the 38th Teijiro Nakahara Award for his work Cutting Axis-Longitude-Latitude. He was selected for Spotlight category of the art fair of London Frieze Masters 2014, presented the 1970's photo works and sculputures. In 2016 he exhibited his works at Tate Modern, London Performing for the Camera and solo at Simon Lee Gallery Invisible Force.
In 2021, for the first time in 15 years at the Japanese museum he presented the new works Keiji Uematsu: Ways of Touching the Invisible - Intuition at Ashiya City Museum of Art and History.

Style and methods 

His works are expressed in a variety of ways, including images (photographs, films, videos), performances (and their image recordings), prints, sculptures, and installations.

The production of the work is called "job (= project)", and the drawing that describes the idea of ​​the project is also presented as an independent work.His work of sculpture or installation is a seemingly unstable structure that combines geometric volumes (cones, spirals) of stone, copper, wood, etc. "I want to express the existence of something invisible, like the universe, with a work in which the entire structure would collapse without one element."

As materials for sculptures and installation works, cloth, stone, glass, iron, stainless steel, copper, bronze, brass, lumber (mainly Douglas fir), and natural wood in their solid state are often used.

His style looks like an abstract, but what is expressed in his work is the embodiment of invisible forces such as gravity.

First in 1971, then in 1972, or even in 1991, he wrote: "What I want to do is to make visible existence, visible connections and visible relations appear more clearly.  And to cause non-visible existence, non-visible connections and non-visible relations to appear.  And to cause visible existence, visible connections and visible relations not to appear.",  "What shall I now do with the world (cosmos) which denies man understanding and where these three relations comprise antinomies?  Shall I find a new meaning in the world?  How to shape relations between people?  These are questions which deeply concern me."

These words expresses the basic concept from the earliest days of his artist's activities.

Exhibitions

Select solo exhibitions 
 1974: Photographs and Films, Gallery Cheap Thrills, Helsinki, Finland
 1975: Galerie St. Petri, Lund, Sweden
 1976: Photographs and Films, Gallery Cheap Thrills, Helsinki, Finland
 1976: Moderna museet, Stockholm, Sweden
 1977: Hetzler+Keller gallery, Stuttgart, Germany
 1977: Situation Interval, New Reform, Aalst, Belgium
 1977: Ausschnitte 1, Städtische Kunsthalle Düsseldorf, Germany
 1979: Installation, Vor Ort Arbeitsgalerie, Hamburg, Germany
 1979: Skulptur, Foto, Heidelberger Kunstverein, Germany
 1980: Cultuurhuis de Warande, Turnhout, Belgium
 1980: International cultural Center, Antwerp, Belgium
 1980: Städtische Galerie im Lenbachhaus+Kunstform, München, Germany
 1980: Installation Axis-Latitude-Longitude, P.S.1, Project Studios 1, New York, USA
 1981: Installations and Drawings, Baudoin Lebon, Paris, France
 1981: Skupturen-Zeichnungen-Fotos, Galerie Löhrl, Mönchengladbach, Germany
 1982: Cathédrale Saint-Trophime d'Arles, Arles, France
 1983: Installation, Baudoin Lebon, Paris, France
 1984: Centrum BeeldendeKunst Rotterdam, The Netherlands
 1985: Project - Drawings and Installations, Galerie Löhrl, Mönchengladbach, Germany
 1986: Installation, Baudoin Lebon, Paris, France
 1989: Project, Kunstraum Neuss, Germany
 1989: Skulpturen und Zeichnungen, Galerie Kiki Maier-Hahn, Düsseldorf, Germany
 1989: Skulpturen und Zeichnungen, Galerie Löhrl, Mönchengladbach, Germany
 1989: GeleZaal, Gent, Belgium
 1990: Sculptures, Waβermann Galerie, München, Germany
 1991: Dortmunder Kunstverein, Germany
 1991: Waβermann Galerie, Köln, Germany
 1991: Baudoin Lebon in FIAC, Grand - Palais, Paris, France
 1992: Baudoin Lebon, Paris, France
 1992: Ursula Blickle Stiftung, Kraichtal, Germany
 1993: The Breathing Space, Waβermann Galerie, München, Germany
 1993: Skulpturen und Zeichnungen, Galerie Löhrl, Mönchengladbach, Germany
 1994: It's Possible, Skulpturen und Zeichnungen, Stadtmuseum Siegburg, Germany
 1995: Invisible Structure, Galerie Beatrice Wassermann, München, Germany
 1997: Behind the Perception, Edwin-Scharff-Haus, Neu-Ulm, Germany
 2001: Baudoin Lebon, Paris, France
 2003: Axis-Latitude-Longitude, Waβermann Galerie, Munchen, Germany
 2004: Falling Water - Rising Water, Baudoin Lebon, Paris, France
 2005: Axis-Latitude-Longitude, Kunstlerverein Marlkasten, Düsseldorf, Germany
 2008: Yearning for What is Floating, Baudoin Lebon, Paris, France
 2009: Yearning for What is Floating, Le Cafe Francais Art Gallery, Brussels, Belgium
 2011: Baudoin Lebon (with vladimir skoda), Paris, France
 2014: Frieze Masters: Spotlight, Regent's Park, London, UK
 2016: Invisible Force and Seeing, Jacobihaus, Kunstlerverein Malkasten, Düsseldorf, Germany
 2016: Invisible Force, Simon Lee Gallery, London, UK
 2016: Seeing/Measuring/..., Baudoin Lebon, Paris, France
 2018: Invisible Force, Galerie Löhrl, Mönchengladbach, Germany
 2019: Keiji Uematsu: Invisible Force, Simon Lee Gallery, New York, USA

Works

Public collections 

 Wilhelm-Hack-Museum, Germany
 Museum für Kunst und Gewerbe, Hamburg, Germany
 Kunsthalle Bremen, Germany
 Städtische Galerie im Lenbachhaus, Munich, Germany
 Museum Wiesbaden, Hesse, Germany
 Daimler Art Collection, Berlin, Germany
 Cartier Foundation for Contemporary Art, Paris, France
 Musée des Arts Décoratifs, Paris, France
 Musée Reattu, Arles, France
 Maison Elsa Triolet Aragon, St-Arnoult en Yvelines, France
 LA CHAPELLE art contemporain, Clairefontaine, France
 Collection Pinault, France
 Moderna Museet, Stockholm, Sweden
 Museum Voorlinden, Wassenaar, The Netherlands
 Bvlgari Collection, N.Y., USA / Rome, Italy
 Museum of Modern Art, New York City, New York, USA
 The Museum of Fine Arts, Houston, USA

Notes

References

Books and Catalogs

Web 
 

1947 births
Living people
21st-century Japanese sculptors
People from Kobe